Carol Feeney (born October 4, 1964) is an American rower who competed in the 1992 Summer Olympics.

Feeney was born in Oak Park, Illinois. She attended college at the University of Wisconsin where she was on the 1986 Varsity Women's Eight team that won the collegiate national title at the Cincinnati Regatta in Bantam, Ohio.  Feeney now works as an eighth grade science teacher at Ottoson Middle School.

Rowing career

 In 1986, her team placed 4th in the World Championships, Nottingham, England (Eight).
 In 1989, her team placed 6th in the World Championships, Bled, Yugoslavia (Eight).
 In 1990, her team placed 5th in the (Coxless Fours), and 6th in the (Eight),  Goodwill Games, Seattle, WA.
 In 1991, her team placed 4th in the World Championships, Vienna, Austria (Eight).
 In 1992, she was a member of the United States team that placed second in the women's Coxless Fours rowing competition in the 1992 Summer Olympics.

References

 
 dataOlympics profile

External links
 

1964 births
Living people
American female rowers
Rowers at the 1992 Summer Olympics
Olympic silver medalists for the United States in rowing
Sportspeople from Oak Park, Illinois
Place of birth missing (living people)
Medalists at the 1992 Summer Olympics
Competitors at the 1990 Goodwill Games
21st-century American women